Shirley Gomes (born January 23, 1940 in Harwich, Massachusetts) is an American politician who served as a Republican member of the Massachusetts House of Representatives from 1995–2007.

A member of the Board of Selectmen from 1987–1995, Gomes first ran for the Massachusetts House in 1992. She ran unopposed in the Republican primary, but lost to incumbent Robert Lawless in the general election. Lawless did not run in the following election and Gomes defeated Democratic nominee Jerry Houk 68%–24%.

Gomes did not run for reelection in 2006 and was succeeded by Sarah Peake, a Democrat from Provincetown.

References

1940 births
American businesspeople in retailing
Living people
Republican Party members of the Massachusetts House of Representatives
People from Harwich, Massachusetts
Women state legislators in Massachusetts
21st-century American women